Polylepis subsericans is a species of plant in the family Rosaceae. It is endemic to Peru.  It is threatened by habitat loss.

References

subsericans
Endemic flora of Peru
Vulnerable plants
Taxonomy articles created by Polbot